Tonio Arango (born 31 January 1963) is a German actor. 

Born in Berlin, Arango is the son of a German mother and a Colombian father and  grew up in Wilmersdorf, then part of West Berlin, surrounded by East Germany, with his brother Sascha Arango, now a screenwriter. He went on to train for an acting career at the Max Reinhardt Seminar, a drama school in Vienna, from 1986 to 1990, and left without graduating. He then became a successful stage actor, appearing in Hamburg, Bochum, Düsseldorf, Cologne, Zurich, and Vienna.

In the Oskar Roehler film No Place to Go (2000) Arango played Ronald alongside Hannelore Elsner. In 2007, he had his first notable television role as a Nazi lawyer, Heinrich von Gernstorff, in March of Millions, with Maria Furtwängler.

Selected appearances
Back to Square One (1994) as Banker
No Place to Go (2000) as Ronald
March of Millions (2007) as Count Gernstorff
Der Kriminalist (2007) "Totgeschwiegen" 
Alarm für Cobra 11 – Die Autobahnpolizei: Highway Maniac (2000) as Jochen 'Joe' Fischer 
Buddenbrooks (2008) as Kistenmaker
SOKO Wismar: Spieglein, Spieglein (2010) as Tom Dahlmann
Cologne P.D.: Waschen, schneiden, töten (2011) as Jesco Brandt
Shakespeares letzte Runde (2016) as Othello 
Cologne P.D.: Der Mann mit der Geige (2017) as Dr Felix Dambrosy
SOKO Wismar: Die Freuden des Alters (2017) as Dr Alexander Immel
Großstadtrevier: Der Master (2018) as Sky Masterssohn
Spy City (2020) as August Froben

Notes

External links
 Tonio Arango at IMDb
 arango.de (official site)
 English Interview from Tonio Arango at YouTube

1963 births
20th-century German male actors
21st-century German male actors
German male film actors
Male actors from Berlin
German people of Colombian descent
Living people